Iván García may refer to:

 Iván García (sprinter) (born 1972), former sprinter from Cuba
 Iván García (diver) (born 1993), Mexican diver
 Iván García Cortina (born 1995), Spanish cyclist
 Iván García (footballer) (1947–1993), Venezuelan footballer